The 1988 Montreal Expos season was the 20th season in franchise history. The Expos finished in 3rd place at 81-81, 20 games behind the New York Mets.

Offseason
 December 7, 1987: Dave Engle was signed as a free agent by the Expos.
 December 16, 1987: Bryn Smith was signed as a free agent by the Expos.
 December 18, 1987: Rex Hudler was signed as a free agent by the Expos.
 December 18, 1987: Dennis Martínez was signed as a free agent by the Expos.
 March 5, 1988: Otis Nixon was signed as a free agent by the Expos.
 March 24, 1988: Graig Nettles was purchased by the Expos from the Atlanta Braves.
 CFL quarterback Matt Dunigan retired from the Canadian Football League in 1988 and chased a childhood dream of professional baseball. Dunigan attended an open tryout with the Montreal Expos and was one of two players selected to sign a contract.

Spring training
The Expos held spring training at West Palm Beach Municipal Stadium in West Palm Beach, Florida – a facility they shared with the Atlanta Braves. It was their 12th season at the stadium; they had conducted spring training there from 1969 to 1972 and since 1981.

Regular season

Opening Day starters
 Hubie Brooks
 Tom Foley
 Andrés Galarraga
 Dennis Martínez
 Tim Raines
 Jeff Reed
 Luis Rivera
 Tim Wallach
 Mitch Webster

Expos pitcher Pascual Pérez threw a five-inning rain-shortened no-hitter against the Phillies on September 24, 1988. It was the first no-hitter in Veterans Stadium history. Perez allowed one walk, and another Phillies baserunner reached on an error. Umpire Harry Wendelstedt waved off the game after a 90-minute rain delay after the game was stopped by a steady rain with one out in the top of the sixth. However, due to a statistical rule change in 1991, no-hitters must last at least nine innings to count. As a result of the retroactive application of the new rule, this game and thirty-five others are no longer considered no-hitters.

Season standings

Record vs. opponents

Notable transactions
 July 13, 1988: Jeff Reed, Herm Winningham, and Randy St. Claire were traded by the Expos to the Cincinnati Reds for Tracy Jones and Pat Pacillo.
 July 14, 1988: Dave Engle was released by the Expos.
 July 23, 1988: Casey Candaele was traded by the Expos to the Houston Astros for Mark Bailey.
 September 1, 1988: The Expos traded a player to be named later to the Texas Rangers for Tom O'Malley. The Expos completed the deal by sending Jack Daugherty to the Rangers on September 13.

Draft picks
 June 1, 1988: 1988 Major League Baseball Draft
Marquis Grissom was drafted by the Expos in the 3rd round. Player signed June 13, 1988.
Bret Barberie was drafted by the Montreal Expos in the 7th round.

Major League debuts
Batters:
Jeff Huson (Sep 2)
Johnny Paredes (Apr 29)
Pitchers:
Tim Barrett (Jul 18)
Brian Holman (Jun 25)
Randy Johnson (Sep 15)

Roster

Player stats

Batting

Starters by position
Note: Pos = Position; G = Games played; AB = At bats; H = Hits; Avg. = Batting average; HR = Home runs; RBI = Runs batted in; SB = Stolen bases

Other batters
Note: G = Games played; AB = At bats; H = Hits; Avg. = Batting average; HR = Home runs; RBI = Runs batted in; SB = Stolen bases

Pitching

Starting pitchers
Note: G = Games pitched; IP = Innings pitched; W = Wins; L = Losses; ERA = Earned run average; SO = Strikeouts

Other pitchers
Note: G = Games pitched; IP = Innings pitched; W = Wins; L = Losses; ERA = Earned run average; SO = Strikeouts

Relief pitchers
Note: G = Games pitched; W = Wins; L = Losses; SV = Saves; ERA = Earned run average; SO = Strikeouts

Award winners

1988 Major League Baseball All-Star Game
 Andrés Galarraga, first base, reserve

Farm system
LEAGUE CHAMPIONS: Indianapolis

References

External links
 1988 Montreal Expos team page at Baseball Reference
 1988 Montreal Expos team page at www.baseball-almanac.com

Montreal Expos seasons
Montreal Expos season
1980s in Montreal
1988 in Quebec